The 1987 NCAA Skiing Championships were contested at the Alyeska Resort in Girdwood, Alaska as part of the 34th annual NCAA-sanctioned ski tournament to determine the individual and team national champions of men's and women's collegiate slalom skiing and cross-country skiing in the United States.

Defending champions Utah, coached by Pat Miller, claimed their fifth team national championship, 83 points ahead of Vermont in the cumulative team standings.

Venue

This year's NCAA skiing championships were hosted at the Alyeska Resort in Girdwood, Alaska.

These were the first championships held in Alaska.

Program

Men's events
 Slalom
 Giant slalom
 Cross country
 Cross country relay

Women's events
 Slalom
 Giant slalom
 Cross country
 Cross country relay

Team scoring

See also
List of NCAA skiing programs

References

1987 in Alaska
NCAA Skiing Championships
NCAA Skiing Championships
1987 in alpine skiing
1987 in cross-country skiing